IMT Atlantique Bretagne Pays de la Loire (also known as École Nationale Supérieure Mines-Télécom Atlantique Bretagne-Pays de la Loire or École des Mines Télécom Atlantique) is a technological university (French grande école), which was created on January 1, 2017 through the merger of the École nationale supérieure des mines de Nantes and Télécom Bretagne. The engineering school is part of the Grandes Écoles, a prestigious group of French institutions dedicated to engineering, scientific research, and business education.
It consists of three campuses: Brest, Nantes, Rennes. IMT Atlantique is a school of the Institut Mines-Télécom and a member of the Université Bretagne Loire.

IMT Atlantique offers a unique generalist engineering diploma. Students from Grandes Écoles preparatory classes may apply through the Concours Commun Mines-Ponts competitive entry exam.

IMT Atlantique is one of the applied schools of the École Polytechnique.

The acceptance rate at IMT Atlantique is 8.7%.

History 
The École Nationale Supérieure des Télécommunications de Bretagne was established in 1977 and the  École Nationale Supérieure des Techniques Industrielles et des Mines de Nantes was established in 1991. In 2009 it came under the administrative supervision of the General Council for the Economy, Industry, Energy and Technologies.

In 2012 the Institut Mines-Télécom was created, merging the Mines Nantes and Télécom Bretagne schools was envisaged from 2014. The merger was agreed upon by both schools on March 24, 2015

The new entity came into existence on January 1, 2017.

On February 2, 2017, the directors of IMT Atlantique and the ENSTA Bretagne signed a partnership agreement between the two institutions in the presence of the Minister of Defense, Jean-Yves Le Drian. The agreement provided for the implementation, in the short and medium term, of collaborative activities in training, research, innovation and internationalization, and the creation of an engineering hub6, 7.

Administration

Director 

 From January 1, 2017: Paul Friedel8

Chairman 

 From January 1, 2017: Guillaume Texier, Chief Executive Officer of Rexel11

Training

Generalist engineer 
IMT Atlantique offers a unique generalist engineering training program mainly drawing on students who have sat the Concours Commun Mines-Ponts competitive entry exam.

Apprentice engineer 
It also offers three apprentice engineer training programs in partnership with the regional authorities of Brittany and the Pays de la Loire region :
 digital transformation of industrial systems, 
 software engineering,
 computer science, networks and telecommunications

Masters 
 Master of science
 Information Technology
 track Communication system and network engineering
 track Datascience
 track Architecture and engineering for the internet of things
 Management of production, logistics and procurement
 track Management and optimization of supply chains and transport
 Process and bioprocess engineering
 track Project management for environmental and energy engineering
 Nuclear Engineering
 track Advanced Nuclear Waste Management
 track Nuclear Energy Production and Industrial Applications
 track Medical applications
 Erasmus Mundus Joint Master Degree
 Management and Engineering of Environment and Energy
 Safe and Reliable Nuclear Applications
 Masters
Innovation management
Electronic, electrical energy, automatic
Complex systems engineering
Fundamental physics
Information technology
Actuariat
Process and bioprocess engineering
Computer science

Post-masters degrees 
 Cybersecurity
 Cybersecurity of maritime and port systems
 Cloud infrastructure and Devops
 IT applied to banking and actuarial decision-making
 Renewable Marine Energies

Doctoral programme 
IMT Atlantique covers 30 doctoral specialities within the five doctoral schools in the Brittany and Pays de la Loire regions with which it is co-accredited.

Academic ranking 
On a national level, right from its first year of existence the school was placed in the A+ group of L'Etudiant's ranking list, thereby entering the French Top 10. (5th in 2022)

IMT Atlantique is ranked between 350-400 by THE (Times Higher Education) Ranking in the World.

On an international level, for the first time this year the school entered a thematic ranking, the ShanghaiRanking's Global Ranking of Academic Subjects. This thematic ranking list is part of the Academic Ranking of World Universities (ARWU), known as "Shanghai", which is the most renowned international ranking list.  It evaluates the scientific excellence of higher learning institutions and few French engineering schools appear on it.

Lastly, the school integrated the top 5% of the Webometrics ranking list, which evaluates an institution's influence through its presence on the Web (visibility, scientific publications, etc.).  This ranking measures international renown and  IMT-Atlantique is doing particularly well in this area. The school currently occupies 1,351st place in the world, out of 27,000 institutions.

IMT Atlantique also participates in U-Multirank, the worldwide ranking list of higher learning institutions established by the European Union, which evaluates each institution in five areas: teaching and learning, research, international orientation, knowledge transfer and regional engagement.  In 2017, this ranking included 1497 institutions in 99 nations.  IMT Atlantique was distinguished in the knowledge transfer category and holds second place in France.

Research

Departments of teaching and research 
Research is organized into thirteen departments of teaching and research

 Automation, Computer-Integrated Manufacturing and IT (Nantes)
 Information Technology (Brest)
 Image and Data Processing (Brest)
 Languages and International Culture (Brest)
 The Logic of Practices, Social and Information Sciences (Brest)
Mathematical and Electrical Engineering (Brest)
 Microwaves (Brest; Toulouse)
 Optics (Brest)
 Subatomic Physics and Related Technologies (Nantes)
 Social Science and Management (Nantes)
 Energy and Environmental Systems (Nantes)
 Network Systems, Cyber Security and Digital Law (Rennes)

Research Units 

The school is also linked to different joint research units:
 GEPEA - Process Engineering for Environment and Food (with the CNRS (French National Center for Scientific Research), ONIRIS (National College of Veterinary Medicine, Food Science and Engineering) and the University of Nantes)
 IRISA - Research Institute of Computer Science and Random Systems (with the CNRS, the École Normale Supérieure de Rennes, the INRIA (French Institute for Research in Computer Science and Automation), the INSA of Rennes (French National Institute of Applied Sciences), the University of South Brittany, the University of Rennes-I and the École Supérieure d'Electricité (CentraleSupélec))
 Lab-STICC -  (Research laboratory in the field of information and communication science and technology) with the CNRS, the University of West Brittany and the University of South Brittany, the ENSTA (graduate and post-graduate engineering school and research institute) of Brittany and the ENIB (graduate school of engineering) of Brest
 LaTIM - Laboratory of Medical Information Processing, with the INSERM (French National Institute of Health and Medical Research) and the University of West Brittany associated with the CHRU (regional university hospital) of Brest
 LS2N - Laboratory of Digital Science, Nantes, with the CNRS, the University of Nantes, the École Centrale de Nantes and INRIA
 Subatech - Laboratory of subatomic physics and associated technologies, with the IN2P3 of the CNRS and the University of Nantes

Chairs 
IMT Atlantique is a certified Institut Carnot for the quality of its collaborative research and is developing a policy of long-term partnerships with businesses through the creation of innovative research facilities.

The school is a member of seven industrial chairs:
 Cybernavale (Cyber defence of naval systems) with the École Navale, Naval Group (formerly DCNS) and Thales
 Cyber CNI (Cyber security of critical infrastructures) with Orange, Nokia, BNP Paribas, La Poste, EDF, Airbus Defense, Amossys and the Société Générale
 Pracom (advanced communications research hub) involving twelve businesses
 C2M (Characterization, modeling and control of electromagnetic wave exposure) with Orange and Télécom ParisTech
 STOCKAGE (Storage of radioactive waste) with EDF, the ANDRA and Areva
 RESOH (Security at the level of inter-organizational relationships) with the IRSN, Areva and Naval Group
 MERITE (teaching chair for the diffusion of scientific, technological and industrial culture), with Assystem

It is also a member of two academic chairs:
 Medical imaging for interventional therapy with the Inserm
 RITE (Risks and emerging technologies: from technological management to social regulation).

Lastly, it is also a member of 7 joint laboratories:
 ADMIRE (Distributed deep learning for the classification of Multimodal, Uncertain and Rare data in ophthalmology), with the company Evolucare Technologies.
 ATOL (Aeronautics Technico-Operational Laboratory): Started in 2005, it is a joint laboratory dedicated mainly to Man-Machine Interface prototyping with, as partners, the École Navale, Thalès Systèmes Aéroportés and Thales Underwater Systems.
 CRC-Lab with the company 4S Network and its subsidiary CRC Services, aims to optimize freight transport in the presence of hazards.
 LATERAL (Labsticc Thales research alliance on Smart On-board Sensor) with Thales-active 3D antennas for new generations of RF autosteering based on new additive technologies.
 SEPEMED (SEcurity & Processing of Externalized MEdical image Data), a joint laboratory with the MEDECOM Company
 TESMARAC The SUBATECH laboratory and the company TRISKEM INTERNATIONAL have created this joint laboratory (LabCom) to develop new resins and new methods for separating radioisotopes, particularly in complex media. 
 Lab-CIS is a joint laboratory of IMT Atlantique and the global engineering group SEGULA Technologies.

IMT Atlantique Campus

Brest campus 
The Brest campus, located in Plouzané on the sea coast, is part of the Brest-Iroise technology hub, on 24.14 hectares, near other higher learning institutions (ENIB and ESIAB).  It consists of school buildings, sports facilities (gymnasiums, stadiums, tennis courts, a weight lifting room and a dance studio), restaurant, student residence, enough housing for all students (twelve buildings), an incubator and an astronomical observatory.

Nantes campus 

The 13.15 hectare campus is situated on the Erdre riverbank in the Atlanpole technology hub, on the Chantrerie campus near other higher learning institutions (Oniris, École supérieure du bois, Polytech Nantes, École de design Nantes Atlantique). It consists of school buildings, sports facilities (gymnasiums, stadiums, tennis courts, and a weight lifting room), restaurant, student residence, enough housing for all students (six buildings), and an academic incubator. The school also has student accommodation in the town center.

Rennes campus 

The Rennes campus is located in Cesson-Sévigné within Rennes Atalante near the research and development centers of major companies  (Orange, Technicolor) and innovative SME/SMIs in fields such as image, networks, connected objects and cyber security (Acklio, Broadpeak, Enensys, NexGuard, Kerlink) along with the technological research institute, b<>com. Third year options include "Networks", "International Business" and "Business and Banking Finance". In 2020, Line B of the Rennes metro should link the campus to the Rennes' town center, from the Atalante station. It consists of school buildings, a student residence, student housing and an incubator.

See also

Related articles 
 Télécom Bretagne
 École nationale supérieure des mines de Nantes
 Institut Mines-Télécom

Notes and references 

Engineering universities and colleges in France
Education in Brest, France
2017 establishments in France